Ekaterina Vasilieva (born 9 September 1986) is a Russian former pair skater. Early in her career, she was a single skater. In 2005, she began competing in pairs with Alexander Smirnov. They placed 6th at the 2006 World Junior Championships for Russia. In the 2007–2008 season, she competed with Daniel Wende for Germany. They are the 2008 German bronze medalists.

Competitive highlights

Pairs with Wende

Pairs with Smirnov

Singles career

Programs 
(with Smirnov)

References

External links

 
 Ekaterina Vasilieva at Tracings.net

1986 births
Living people
Russian female pair skaters
German female pair skaters
Figure skaters from Saint Petersburg